The 1983–84 Quebec Nordiques season was the Nordiques fifth season in the National Hockey League.  In the 1982–83 season, Quebec won a club record 34 games, and finished fourth in the Adams Division earning 80 points, making the post-season for the third consecutive season.  The Nordiques would fall to the Montreal Canadiens in six games in the Adams Division Finals.

Off-season

During the off-season, Quebec named defenseman Mario Marois as their new team captain.  The club played the 1982–83 season with no captain.  Marois, an eight-year NHL veteran, had been with the Nordiques since the 1980-81 season.  In early June, the Nordiques and Buffalo Sabres pulled off a blockbuster deal, with Quebec sending Real Cloutier and their first round draft pick in the 1983 NHL Entry Draft to Buffalo in exchange for Tony McKegney, Andre Savard, Jean-Francois Sauve, and the Sabres third round draft pick in the 1983 NHL Entry Draft.

Regular season
The Nordiques would get off to a fast start, earning a 7-2-1 record in their first ten games.  The team fell into a slump though, and found themselves under .500 with a 10-11-3 record.  Quebec would snap out of the slump, and end the season with a club record 42 victories and 94 points, finishing in third place in the Adams Division, their highest final standing position in club history, and making the post-season for the fourth straight season.  Quebec scored a club record 360 goals, and allowed a franchise low 278 goals.

Offensively, the Nordiques were led by Michel Goulet, who scored a team high 56 goals, which was the second highest total in the NHL, while adding 65 assists, recording 121 points, the third highest total in the league.  Peter Stastny was right behind Goulet, as he scored 46 goals and 73 assists for 119 points, finishing fourth in the league scoring race.  Dale Hunter had a solid season, scoring 24 goals and 79 points, as he recorded a team high 232 penalty minutes, while Wilf Paiement had 39 goals and 76 points.  Newly appointed team captain Mario Marois led the Nordiques blueline, scoring 13 goals and 49 points.

In goal, Dan Bouchard had a very solid season, winning a franchise record 29 games, while posting a team low 3.20 GAA, and earning a shutout in 57 games.

Season standings

Schedule and results

Playoffs
The Nordiques opened the 1984 Stanley Cup playoffs with a best of five Adams Division semi-final series against the Buffalo Sabres.  The Sabres finished the season in second place in the Adams Division, earning a record of 48-25-7 for 103 points.  The series opened with two games at the Buffalo Memorial Auditorium; however, Quebec struck first, holding off the Sabres for a 3-2 victory in the first game, followed by a 6-2 thrashing in the second game to take a 2-0 series lead.  The series moved back to Le Colisée, and the Nordiques made short work of the Sabres, defeating them 4-1 in the third game, to record their first ever series sweep in team history, advancing to the Adams Division finals.

Quebec would face the Montreal Canadiens in the best of seven Division finals.  The Canadiens had a 35-40-5 record in the regular season, earning 75 points and a fourth-place finish.  Montreal upset the powerful Boston Bruins in their first round series, as the Canadiens swept the Bruins in three games.  The series opened with two games at Le Colisée, and the Nordiques took the first game with a 4-2 victory, however, the Canadiens evened the series up in the second game, beating Quebec 4-1.  The series shifted to the Montreal Forum for the next two games, and the Canadiens took their first series lead, defeating Quebec 2-1 in the third game.  The Nordiques rebounded in the fourth game with a 4-3 overtime victory in the fourth game to even the series up once again.  The fifth game was played back in Quebec City, but it was the Canadiens who took control of the series, shutting out the Nordiques 4-0.  With the Nordiques on the brink of elimination in the sixth game, back in Montreal, the team stormed out to a 2-0 lead before a bench clearing brawl broke out, in which Dale Hunter and Peter Stastny of the Nordiques were ejected from the game. The Canadiens took advantage of the situation, and scored five unanswered goals in the third period, to win the game 5-3 and eliminate the Nordiques from the playoffs.

Quebec Nordiques 3, Buffalo Sabres 0

Montreal Canadiens 4, Quebec Nordiques 2

Player statistics

Awards
 First NHL All-Star team: Michel Goulet

Transactions
The Nordiques were involved in the following transactions during the 1983–84 season.

Trades

Waivers

Draft picks
Quebec's draft picks from the 1983 NHL Entry Draft which was held at the Montreal Forum in Montreal, Quebec.

References

External links
 SHRP Sports
 The Internet Hockey Database
 Hockey Reference
 Goalies Archive

Quebec Nordiques season, 1983-84
Quebec Nordiques seasons
Que